Rumex azoricus is a species of sorrel in the family Polygonaceae. It is endemic to the Azores, Portugal.

Distribution and habitat
Rumex azoricus has been observed in five of the nine Azorean islands, specifically in São Miguel, Terceira, São Jorge, Faial and Corvo. It lives in caldeiras, watercourses and natural meadows. In São Jorge it also appears in clearings of coastal forests of Erica azorica and Myrica faya.

References

azoricus
Endemic flora of the Azores
Plants described in 1948